William Tattersall was an English professional association footballer who played as a full back. He played five matches in the Football League First Division for Burnley.

References

Year of death missing
Year of birth missing
English footballers
Association football fullbacks
Heywood F.C. players
Burnley F.C. players
Nelson F.C. players
English Football League players